Tinga Tinga Tales is a British flash animated children's television series based on African folk tales and aimed at 4 to 6-year-olds. It was commissioned by the BBC for its CBeebies channel, and by Disney Channel for its Disney Junior block. Named after Tingatinga art from Tanzania, Tinga Tinga Tales was produced in Nairobi, Kenya, by Homeboyz Animation, a studio of approximately 50 people. The music is produced by Kenyan singer-songwriter Eric Wainaina. The series comprises 55 episodes and is also available on BBC iPlayer.

The series was first conceived by Claudia Lloyd, head of animation at the London-based Tiger Aspect Productions, while travelling through Africa. The first three episodes premiered on the BBC website in early February 2010. The distribution rights have been bought by Entertainment Rights (which in 2009 merged with Classic Media, then in 2012 it was acquired by DreamWorks Animation and renamed into DreamWorks Classics, and ultimately became the property of Universal Television in 2016).

Synopsis
Tinga Tinga Tales is centred around various animated animals, and employs music, dialogue and colourful imagery to tell African folk tales about the origins of animals, each narrated by Red Monkey, and answer questions such as "Why do monkeys swing in the trees?" and "Why do flamingos stand on one leg?".

Characters

Main characters
 Red Monkey (voiced by Eugene Muchiri (UK)/Geoffrey Curtin (US)): Red Monkey is the narrator of all of the episodes.
 Elephant (voiced by Lenny Henry): Elephant has a trunk that cleans his friends.
 Lion (voiced by Patrice Naiambana): Lion is the king of Tinga Tinga.
 Tortoise (voiced by Shaun Parkes): Tortoise is the genius.
 Hippo (voiced by Johnnie Fiori): Hippo lives in a water hole.
 Tickbird (voiced by Tameka Empson (UK)/Elizabeth Curtin (US)): Tickbird is the smallest main character.
 Orange Monkey (voiced by Ben Spybey)
 Yellow Monkey (voiced by Faraaz Meghani)

African characters
 Buffalo (voiced by Lenny Henry)
 Bat (voiced by Prince Abura (UK)/Jules de Jongh (US))
 Frog (voiced by Wakanyote Njuguna)
 Warthog (voiced by Kennie Andrews)
 Porcupine (voiced by Catherine Wambua)
 Crocodile (voiced by Edward Kwach)
 Chameleon (voiced by Patrick Kayeki (UK)/Kerry Shale (US))
 Hare (voiced by Felix Dexter (UK)/John Guerrasio (US))
 Vulture (voiced by Felix Dexter (UK)/Lorelei King (US))
 Giraffe (voiced by Miriam Margolyes)
 Lizard (voiced by Junior Simpson)
 Eagle (voiced by Ninia Benjamin)
 Mosquito (voiced by Ninia Benjamin)
 Bushbaby (voiced by Bhumi Patel)
 Cheetah (voiced by Angelina Koinange (UK)/Sophie Okonedo (US))
 Cubs (voiced by Tracy Rabar, Mikayla Odera, Cullie Ruto)
 Snake (voiced by Johnny Daukes (UK)/Dan Russell (US))
 Aardvark (voiced by Johnny Daukes)
 Puffadder (voiced by Johnny Daukes)
 Jackal (voiced by Terence Reis)
 Rhino (voiced by Terence Reis)
 Ants (voiced by Terence Reis)
 Chief Ant (voiced by Peter King)
 Lieutenant Ant (voiced by Eric Wainaina)
 Wildebeests (voiced by Terence Reis)
 Zebra (voiced by Eddie Kadi (UK)/Dan Russell (US))
 Parrot (voiced by Eddie Kadi)
 Flamingo (voiced by Flaminia Cinque)
 Ostrich (voiced by Janet Suzman)
 Camel (voiced by Paul Shearer (Season 1)/Jim Cummings (Season 2))
 Dragonfly (voiced by Corine Onyango)
 Leopard (voiced by Dona Croll)
 Hyena (voiced by Stephen K Amos)
 Millipede/Pediless (voiced by Stephen K Amos)
 Baboon (voiced by Anton Rice)
 Guinea Fowl (voiced by Rosemary Leach)
 Meerkat (voiced by Morwenna Banks)
 Impala (voiced by Claudia Lloyd)
 Bees (voiced by Claudia Lloyd)
 Queen Bee (voiced by Penelope Keith)
 Cricket (voiced by Derek Griffiths)
 Tinga Tinga Birds (voiced by Atemi Oyungu, Muthoni Mburu)

North American characters
 Skunk (voiced by Derek Griffiths)
 Caterpillar/Butterfly (voiced by Akiya Henry)
 Squirrel (voiced by Miriam Margolyes)
 Woodpecker (voiced by Akiya Henry) 
 Owl (voiced by Meera Syal)
 Flea (voiced by Akiya Henry)
 Crow (voiced by Achieng Abura)
 Hen (voiced by Lindiwe Brown Mkhize)
 Spider (voiced by Jocelyn Jee Esien)
 Hummingbird (voiced by Maureen Lipman)
 Mole (voiced by Sophie Thompson)

Asian characters
 Peacock (voiced by Cyril Nri)

Ocean characters
 Whale (voiced by Ruth Madoc)
 Crab  (voiced by Terence Reis)
 Fish (voiced by Claudia Lloyd)

Mysterious characters
 Majitu the Giant (voiced by Colin McFarlane)
 The Sleeping Stones (voiced by Nonso Anozie)
 The Wind (voiced by Terence Reis)

Episodes

Pilot (2008)
 0. Tinga Tinga Tales (2008)

Series 1 (2010)
 1.  Why Elephant Has a Trunk (1 February 2010)
 2.  Why Snake Has No Legs (18 March 2010)
 3.  Why Hippo Has No Hair (22 February 2010)
 4.  Why Tortoise Has a Broken Shell (3 February 2010)
 5.  Why Hen Pecks the Ground (8 February 2010)
 6.  Why Bat Hangs Upside-down (26 February 2010)
 7.  Why Warthog is So Ugly (16 February 2010)
 8.  Why Owl's Head Turns All the Way Round (4 February 2010)
 9.  Why Monkeys Swing in the Trees (15 February 2010)
 10. Why Tickbird Sits on Hippo's Back (15 March 2010)
 11. Why Frog Croaks (19 February 2010)
 12. Why Spider Has a Tiny Waist (9 February 2010)
 13. Why Vulture is Bald (10 February 2010)
 14. Why Giraffe Has a Long Neck (2 February 2010)
 15. Why Porcupine Has Quills (23 February 2010)
 16. Why Lizard Hides Under Rocks (5 February 2010)
 17. Why Crocodile Has a Bumpy Back (16 March 2010)
 18. Why Jackal Howls at the Moon (18 February 2010)
 19. Why Hare Hops (24 February 2010)
 20. Why Mosquito Buzzes (12 March 2010)
 21. Why Rhino Charges (17 February 2010)
 22. Why Caterpillar is Never in a Hurry (11 February 2010)
 23. Why Lion Roars (12 February 2010)
 24. Why Zebra Has Stripes (17 March 2010)
 25. Why Flamingo Stands on One Leg (19 March 2010)
 26. Why Woodpecker Pecks (29 April 2010)

Series 2 (2010–11)
 27. Why Ostrich Sticks Her Head in the Ground (22 November 2010)
 28. Why Camel Has a Hump (23 November 2010)
 29. Why Wildebeest Stampede (24 November 2010)
 30. Why Chameleon Changes Colour (25 November 2010)
 31. Why Leopard Has Spots (26 November 2010)
 32. Why Hyena Has Short Back Legs (29 November 2010)
 33. Why Ants Work Together (30 November 2010)
 34. Why Flea Jumps (1 December 2010)
 35. Why Hummingbird Hums (2 December 2010)
 36. Why Baboon Has a Bare Bottom (3 December 2010)
 37. Why Bees Sting (6 December 2010)
 38. Why Peacock Struts (7 December 2010)
 39. Why Aardvark Has a Sticky Tongue (8 December 2010)
 40. Why Whale Spouts (9 December 2010)
 41. Why Parrot Can't Keep a Secret (10 December 2010)
 42. Why Bushbaby Has Big Eyes (21 March 2011)
 43. Why Guinea Fowl Has Dots (22 March 2011)
 44. Why Buffalo Has Horns (23 March 2011)
 45. Why Puffadder Sheds His Skin (24 March 2011)
 46. Why Eagle Rules the Skies (25 March 2011)
 47. Why Skunk Smells (26 March 2011)
 48. Why Cricket Chirrups (27 March 2011)
 49. Why Mole Lives Underground (28 March 2011)
 50. Why Squirrel Gathers Nuts (29 March 2011)
 51. Why Meerkat is Always on the Lookout (30 March 2011)
 52. Why Cheetah Has Tears (31 March 2011)

References

External links
 
 Official site
 
 Miscellaneous Crew

2010 British television series debuts
2010 Kenyan television series debuts
2011 British television series endings
2011 Kenyan television series endings
2010s British children's television series
2010s Kenyan television series
BBC children's television shows
British children's animated adventure television series
Kenyan animated television series
British flash animated television series
British television shows based on children's books
Animated television series about elephants
Animated television series about lions
Animated television series about monkeys
Animated television series about turtles
2010s British animated television series
Television series by Tiger Aspect Productions
Television series by Endemol
DreamWorks Classics
CBeebies
British preschool education television series
Animated preschool education television series
2010s preschool education television series